Vinayaka Chaviti is a 1957 Telugu-language Hindu mythological film written and directed by Samudrala Sr. It stars N. T. Rama Rao and Jamuna with music composed by Ghantasala. It was produced by K. Gopala Rao under the Aswaraja Pictures banner. The story is of Syamantakopakhyanam, annually read during the Ganesh Chaturthi festival day celebrations of Lord Vinayaka. The film was dubbed into Tamil as Vinayaga Chathurthi and was released in 1959 and later into Hindi in 1973 as Ganesh Chaturti.

Plot
The film begins, with Goddess Parvathi Devi making a mud sculpture of a boy and breathing life into it, making him as a guard when she goes to the bath. According to her ordinance, he does not let anyone in. At that juncture, Lord Siva arrives, the child stops him when enraged Siva beheads him. Later, realizing the boy as his son, Siva makes him alive with the head of a demon elephant Gajasura his ardent devotee, giving the name Gajanana, a man with an elephant face and makes him the lord of the Ganas.

During the celebration, Lord Chandra laughs at Gajanana and gets cursed that one who sees him on Vinayaka Chavithi will face ignominy by false rumours. Eras roll by, it's the period of Dvapara Yuga when Lord Krishna (N. T. Rama Rao) once sees Chandra in milk at Rukmini's (Krishna Kumari) residence.

At that same time, Satrajit (Gummadi) a staunch devotee of the Sun god, acquires a special jewel Syamantaka Mani as a boon which presents a huge amount of gold daily. Knowing it, Krishna requests him to give it to him so that it could be used for public welfare to which Satrajit refuses and develops animosity with Krishna.

Parallelly, Satyabhama (Jamuna) daughter of Satrajit, falls for Krishna, cognizant of it, her father forcibly fixes her alliance with Satadhanva (R. Nageswara Rao). Meanwhile, Prasena (Rajanala) the younger brother of Satrajit moves to hunt wearing the jewel where a lion slaughters him and runs off with the jewel which has been picked up by Jambavanta and gifts to his daughter Jambavati. At present, Satrajit denounces Krishna as the murderer of his brother, so, he immediately lands in the forest to remove his mar.

Right now, he finds that the jewel is possessed by Jambavanta and the war erupts between them continuously for 28 days when Jambavanta is defeated. At that moment, he realizes Krishna as a reincarnation of his Lord Rama who has arrived to fulfill his vow which he has given in Rama Avatar to have a duel fight with him. Soon Jambavanta bestows the jewel along with his daughter. After return, Krishna gives back the jewel to Satrajit when he feels guilty and hands over it and his daughter Satyabhama to Krishna. During the time of their wedding, enraged Satadhanva attacks slay Satrajit, and escape with the jewel when Krishna decapitates him with Sudarsana Chakra. Finally, the movie ends on a happy note.

Cast
N. T. Rama Rao as Lord Krishna
Jamuna as Satyabhama
Krishna Kumari as Rukmini
Gummadi as Satrajit
Rajanala as Prasena   
R. Nageswara Rao as Sathadhana
A. Prakasa Rao as Narada Maharshi
Balakrishna as Vasanthaka 
Suryakala as Goddess Parvathi
Satya Devi as Jambavathi

Music 

Music was composed by Ghantasala. Lyrics were written by Samudrala Sr. The song Dinakara Subhakara is a memorable.

References

External links
 

1950s Telugu-language films
1957 films
Hindu mythological films
Indian black-and-white films
Films scored by Ghantasala (musician)
Films based on the Bhagavata Purana